Wolffiella gladiata, the Florida mudmidget, is an aquatic plant in the family Araceae. It is one of the smallest flowering plants known, a mere 3–9 mm long. It occurs in quiet waters in the states along the Atlantic and Gulf Coasts of the United States from Texas to New Jersey plus in the states of the Ohio River Valley. Additional specimens have been collected from Massachusetts, Washington, and the Distrito Federal de México.

References

Lemnoideae
Aquatic plants
Flora of the Southeastern United States
Plants described in 1868
Flora of Texas
Flora of Oklahoma
Flora of Washington (state)
Flora of Missouri
Flora of Illinois
Flora of the Northeastern United States
Flora without expected TNC conservation status